Barfuß bis zum Hals is a German comedy television film released in 2009.

Plot
A nudist site in eastern Germany is sold to Dieter Lohe, a conservative textile manufacturer from Bavaria. He visits his new property with his daughter Natalie, and plans to use the property as a hunting ground. For fear of losing their tenancy agreement, the members of the association adjust to Lohe's presence by walking around dressed. Jakob Steiner, the son of the club's leader, doesn't accept the nudist family tradition and because of this argues with his father. Jacob becomes close friends with Lohe's daughter. Lohe eventually gets wise to the clothed nudists, and after a few complications all of the parties involved come to an arrangement.

References

External links 
 

2009 television films
2009 films
German television films
2000s German-language films
German-language television shows
Sat.1 original programming